Trevor George McMahon (born 8 November 1929) is a New Zealand former cricketer. He played for the New Zealand cricket team in five Test matches as a wicket-keeper in the 1955-56 season – totalling seven runs in seven innings. He was born in Wellington.

Life and career
McMahon studied engineering at Wellington Technical College between 1943 and 1948, playing cricket and rugby for the school. He served an apprenticeship with the railways as a fitter and turner.

He made his first-class debut for Wellington in 1953-54 when Wellington's regular wicket-keeper Frank Mooney was touring South Africa with the Test team. Mooney retired after the 1954-55 Plunket Shield season, and McMahon returned to the side for Wellington's match against the touring MCC. He was selected for the tour of Pakistan and India in 1955-56, where he and Eric Petrie each played four of the eight Tests. McMahon played the First Test against West Indies in New Zealand later that season, but he then lost his place to Sammy Guillen, who had topped the batting averages in that season's Plunket Shield. McMahon married a nurse, Miss D. I. Perry, in Wellington in January 1956, immediately after returning from the tour of Pakistan and India.

Mike Curtis took over the wicket-keeping for Wellington for the next three seasons, but McMahon returned in 1959-60. Oddly for someone whose last 16 first-class innings had produced only 43 runs, McMahon opened the batting throughout the 1959-60 season. He scored 42 in the first match against Central Districts and 41 in the next against Otago, but only 29 in the next three matches, and he returned to the tail in 1960-61. In 1960-61 he set a new record for the Plunket Shield when he made 23 dismissals (22 caught, one stumped) in the season.

He played for Wellington throughout the 1961-62 season when the Test team was touring South Africa, but the new Test wicket-keeper Artie Dick took over Wellington's wicket-keeping in 1962-63, and McMahon played only a few more matches in 1963-64 and 1964-65.

Following the death of John Richard Reid on 14 October 2020, McMahon became the oldest surviving New Zealand Test cricketer.

References

External links
 
 

1929 births
Living people
People educated at Wellington High School, New Zealand
New Zealand cricketers
New Zealand Test cricketers
Wellington cricketers
Cricketers from Wellington City
South Island cricketers
Wicket-keepers